Sushma Seth (born 20 June 1936) is an Indian stage, film and television actress. She started her career in the 1950s, and was a founder member of the Delhi-based theatre group Yatrik. Her first movie was Junoon in 1978. She is known for playing a mother and grandmother role in movies and on television, and notable for her role as Dadi in the pioneering TV soap Hum Log (1984–1985). She has worked with famous directors like Dev Raj Ankur, Ram Gopal Bajaj, Manish Joshi Bismil and Chander Shekhar Sharma.

Early and personal life 
Brought up in Delhi she completed her schooling at Convent of Jesus and Mary, New Delhi. Thereafter Sushma did a teachers training diploma in home science, Lady Irwin College, New Delhi, Associate in Science diploma, Briarcliff College, New York, and later, Bachelor of Fine Arts, from Carnegie Mellon, Pittsburgh, United States.

Sushma Seth and her husband, businessman Dhruv Seth, have three children. Among them is actress Divya Seth, who acted alongside her mother in Hum Log and Dekh Bhai Dekh.

Career

Seth started her career on stage in the 1950s. With Joy Michael, Rati Bartholomew, Roshan Seth and others, she was one of the founders of the Delhi-based theatre group Yatrik in 1964. In addition to acting, she has directed many plays. In the 1970s, she founded and ran the Children's Creative Theatre, an ensemble that put up plays and conducted workshops for children.

She made her big screen debut with Shyam Benegal's 1978 period film Junoon, in which she played Shashi Kapoor's aunt. She has starred in some of the biggest hits in the Indian industry including Silsila, Prem Rog, Ram Teri Ganga Maili, Chandni, Deewana, Kabhi Khushi Kabhie Gham and Kal Ho Naa Ho. She also appeared in the Punjabi film Chann Pardesi (1980).

She received a nomination for the Filmfare Best Supporting Actress Award for her role in the 1985 B. R. Chopra film Tawaif. She has played the mother and grandmother of many Bollywood performers including Rishi Kapoor, Akshay Kumar, Shahrukh Khan, Hrithik Roshan, Anil Kapoor and Preity Zinta.

Seth appeared in the TV sitcom Dekh Bhai Dekh (1993), directed by Anand Mahendroo, where she played the matriarch of the Divan family. She has also worked with theatre directors like Ram Gopal Bajaj and Manish Joshi Bismil. She is notable for her performance on the TV soap Hum Log, telecast in the early 80s on Doordarshan, in which she played Daadi (the grandmother). Seth was so popular that her character, who was shown suffering from throat cancer, had to be extended on viewer's demand.

Since the early 2000s, Seth has been working with an NGO called Arpana, directing plays and dance dramas. She has written a play called Sitaron Ke Paas inspired by the life of astronaut Kalpana Chawla.

Filmography

 Junoon (1978) as Javed's chachi
 Chann Pardesi (1980) as Jassi (Punjabi movie)
 Kalyug (1981) as Savitri
 Silsila (1981)
 Swami Dada (1982) as Seema's mom
 Prem Rog (1982) as Badi Maa
 Romance (1983) as Mrs. Roy
 Naukar Biwi Ka (1983) as Sandhya's foster mom
 Salma (1985) as Mrs. Bakar Ali
 Khamosh (1985) as Leela
 Tawaif (1985) as Nadira
 Ram Teri Ganga Maili (1985) as Naren's Grandmother
 Meraa Ghar Mere Bachche (1985)
 Wafadaar (1985) as Mrs. Namdev
 Faasle (1985)
 Alag Alag (1985) as Neeraj's mom
 Maa Kasam (1985) as Thakurain
 Palay Khan (1986) as Fatima Khalim
 Nagina (1986) as Rajiv's mother
 Kala Dhanda Goray Log (1986) as Mrs. Durga
 Janbaaz (1986) as Laxmi Singh
 Pyar Kiya Hai Pyar Karenge (1986) as Annapurnadevi
 Naache Mayuri (1986)
 Mard Ki Zabaan (1987)
 Khudgarz (1987) as Sita Sinha
 Avam (1987) as Durga Jagrathan
 Apne Apne (1987) as Mrs. Kapoor
 Dharamyudh (1988) as Kundan's mother
 Aurat Teri Yehi Kahani (1988) as Jamunabai
 Aakhri Adaalat (1988) as Mrs. Kaushal
 Hum Farishte Nahin (1988) as Supriya
 Waaris (1988) as Paro's mom
 Suryaa: An Awakening (1989) as Salma Khan
 Mitti Aur Sona (1989) as Mrs. Yashoda Bhushan
 Gharana (1989) as Shraddha
 Kasam Suhaag Ki (1989)
 Bade Ghar Ki Beti (1989) as Mrs. Din Dayal
 Toofan (1989) as Devyani
 Chandni (1989) as Mrs. Gupta
 Jawani Zindabad (1990) as Sharda Sharma
 Jaan-E-Wafa (1990)
 Amiri Garibi (1990) as Sona's Aunt
 Shankara (1991) as Rani Maa
 First Love Letter (1991) as Uma Devi
 Khoon Ka Karz (1991) as Savitri Devi
 Ajooba (1991) as Zarina Khan
 Do Matwale (1991) as Amar's Mother
 Maa as Heerabai
 Heer Ranjha (1992) as Heer's mom
 Suryavanshi (1992) as Rajmata
 Sarphira (1992) as Mrs. B.K. Sinha
 Inteha Pyar Ki (1992) as Mrs. Shankar Dayal Walia
 Deewana (1992) as Laxmi Devi
 Bol Radha Bol (1992) as Sumitra Malhotra
 Dil Aashna Hai (1992) as Mrs. Baig
 In Custody (1993) as Safiya Begum
 Pyaar Ka Tarana (1993)
 1942: A Love Story (1993) as Gayatridevi Singh
 Tejasvini (1994) as grandma
 Daraar (1996) as Mrs. Malhotra
 Kareeb (1998) as Lata
 Bade Miyan Chote Miyan (1998) as Seema's mother
 Daag: The Fire (1999) as Dai
 Taal (1999) as Mrs. Mehta
 Chal Mere Bhai (2000) as Grandmother
 Dhadkan (2000) as Ram's stepmother
 Dhaai Akshar Prem Ke (2000) as Yogi's mom
 Shikari (2000) as Rajeshwari's mother
 Raja Ko Rani Se Pyar Ho Gaya (2000) as Manisha's Mother
 Moksha: Salvation (2001) as Ritika's grandmother
 Kabhi Khushi Kabhie Gham... (2001) as Kaur, Nandini's mother
 Tujhe Meri Kasam (2003) as grandmother
 Rasikan Re (2003)
 Kal Ho Naa Ho (2003) as Lajoji
 Pal Pal Dil Ke Ssaat (2009)
 Student Of The Year (2012)
 Shaandaar (2015)
 Tamasha (2015)
 Noor (2017)
Mehram (2018) as Noor Bibi, short film released on ZEE5

Television

 Staying On (1980) as Codcod Menektara
 Hum Log (1984) as Dadi
 Dekh Bhai Dekh (1993) as Sarla Diwan
 Amma and Family (1995) as Ammi
 Miilee (2005)
 Kash-m-Kash
 Ret Par Likhe Naam
 Qaid
 Kaun
 Yeh Hui Na Baat
Dard ka Rishta (2014) as Ganga Dindyal Sharma
 Alibaba
 Vansh
 Aradhana
 Tanha
 Zanjeerein
 Star Bestsellers

References

External links
 
 
 Official website

Living people
People from Delhi
Carnegie Mellon University College of Fine Arts alumni
Delhi University alumni
Indian film actresses
Indian television actresses
Indian soap opera actresses
Indian stage actresses
Actresses in Hindi cinema
Actresses in Hindi television
20th-century Indian actresses
21st-century Indian actresses
1936 births